Kirovohrad Oblast is subdivided into districts (raions) which are subdivided into territorial communities (hromadas).

Current

On 18 July 2020, the number of districts was reduced to four. These are:
 Holovanivsk (Голованівський район), the center is in the urban-type settlement of Holovanivsk;
 Kropyvnytskyi (Кропивницький район), the center is in the city of Kropyvnytskyi;
 Novoukrainka (Новоукраїнський район), the center is in the town of Novoukrainka; 
 Oleksandriia (Олександрійський район), the center is in the town of Oleksandriia.

Administrative divisions until 2020

Before July 2020, Kirovohrad Oblast was subdivided into 25 regions: 21 districts (raions) and 4 city municipalities (mis'krada or misto), officially known as territories governed by city councils.

Cities under the oblast's jurisdiction:
Kropyvnytskyi Municipality
Cities and towns under the city's jurisdiction:
Kropyvnytskyi (Кропивницьки), formerly Kirovohrad, the administrative center of the oblast
Urban-type settlements under the city's jurisdiction:
Nove (Нове)
Oleksandriia Municipality
Cities and towns under the city's jurisdiction:
Oleksandriia (Олександрія)
Urban-type settlements under the city's jurisdiction:
Oleksandriiske (Олександрійське), formerly Dymytrove
Pantaivka (Пантаївка)
Svitlovodsk Municipality
Cities and towns under the city's jurisdiction:
Svitlovodsk (Світловодськ)
Urban-type settlements under the city's jurisdiction:
Vlasivka (Власівка)
Znamianka Municipality
Cities and towns under the city's jurisdiction:
Znamianka (Знам'янка)
Urban-type settlements under the city's jurisdiction:
Znamianka Druha (Знам'янка Друга)
Districts (raions):
Blahovishchenske Raion (Благовіщенський район), formerly Ulianovka Raion
Cities and towns under the district's jurisdiction:
Blahovishchenske (Благовіщенське), formerly Ulianovka
Bobrynets (Бобринецький район)
Cities and towns under the district's jurisdiction:
Bobrynets (Бобринець)
Dobrovelychkivka (Добровеличківський район)
Cities and towns under the district's jurisdiction:
Pomichna (Помічна)
Urban-type settlements under the district's jurisdiction:
Dobrovelychkivka (Добровеличківка)
Dolynska (Долинський район)
Cities and towns under the district's jurisdiction:
Dolynska (Долинська)
Urban-type settlements under the district's jurisdiction:
Molodizhne (Молодіжне)
Haivoron (Гайворонський район)
Cities and towns under the district's jurisdiction:
Haivoron (Гайворон)
Urban-type settlements under the district's jurisdiction:
Salkove (Салькове)
Zavallia (Завалля)
Holovanivsk (Голованівський район)
Urban-type settlements under the district's jurisdiction:
Holovanivsk (Голованівськ)
Pobuzke (Побузьке)
Kompaniivka (Компаніївський район)
Urban-type settlements under the district's jurisdiction:
Kompaniivka (Компаніївка)
Kropyvnytskyi (Кропивницький район), formerly Kirovohrad Raion
Mala Vyska (Маловисківський район)
Cities and towns under the district's jurisdiction:
Mala Vyska (Мала Виска)
Urban-type settlements under the district's jurisdiction:
Smoline (Смоліне)
Novhorodka (Новгородківський район)
Urban-type settlements under the district's jurisdiction:
Novhorodka (Новгородка)
Novoarkhanhelsk (Новоархангельський район)
Urban-type settlements under the district's jurisdiction:
Novoarkhanhelsk (Новоархангельськ)
Novomyrhorod (Новомиргородський район)
Cities and towns under the district's jurisdiction:
Novomyrhorod (Новомиргород)
Urban-type settlements under the district's jurisdiction:
Kapitanivka (Капітанівка)
Novoukrainka (Новоукраїнський район)
Cities and towns under the district's jurisdiction:
Novoukrainka (Новоукраїнка)
Oleksandriia (Олександрійський район)
Urban-type settlements under the district's jurisdiction:
Nova Praha (Нова Прага)
Pryiutivka (Приютівка)
Oleksandrivka (Олександрівський район)
Urban-type settlements under the district's jurisdiction:
Lisove (Лісове)
Oleksandrivka (Олександрівка)
Yelyzavethradka (Єлизаветградка)
Onufriivka (Онуфріївський район)
Urban-type settlements under the district's jurisdiction:
Onufriivka (Онуфріївка)
Pavlysh (Павлиш)
Petrove (Петрівський район)
Urban-type settlements under the district's jurisdiction:
Balakhivka (Балахівка)
Petrove (Петрове)
Svitlovodsk (Світловодський район)
Ustynivka (Устинівський район)
Urban-type settlements under the district's jurisdiction:
Ustynivka (Устинівка)
Vilshanka (Вільшанський район)
Urban-type settlements under the district's jurisdiction:
Vilshanka (Вільшанка)
Znamianka (Знам'янський район)

References

Kirovohrad
Kirovohrad Oblast